Complément d'enquête (Complementary Investigation) is an investigative newsmagazine presented by Benoît Duquesne and shown in Metropolitan France on France 2 weekdays late in the evening, and, in Canada, bi-monthly on TV5.

A similar investigative programme, Panorama, is shown in the UK on BBC television.

References

French television news shows